Fist Fight is a 2017 American comedy film directed by Richie Keen and written by Van Robichaux and Evan Susser. The film stars Ice Cube, Charlie Day, Tracy Morgan and Jillian Bell with Dean Norris, Christina Hendricks, Kumail Nanjiani and Dennis Haysbert in supporting roles.

When school teacher Andy Campbell causes another teacher's termination, he is challenged to an after-school fist fight.

The film premiered in Los Angeles on February 13, 2017, and was theatrically released in the United States on February 17, 2017. It grossed $41 million worldwide and received negative reviews from critics. It was released on DVD and Blu-ray on May 30, 2017.

Plot 
On the last day before summer vacation, students devise an elaborate senior prank, and faculty members try to survive the chaotic day as best they can. Meanwhile, English teacher Andy Campbell hears rumors of downsizing of all departments. Given the fact that he has a pregnant wife and a child, this renders him extremely anxious.

History teacher Ron Strickland later asks him for his assistance in a class. During it, a student named Neil secretly uses his smartphone to prank Strickland. Enraged, Strickland grabs a fire axe and destroys Neil's desk, sending the class panicking from the room.

Both Campbell and Strickland are brought to Principal Tyler's office to discuss the matter. Despite initially deciding to keep what happened a secret, after Tyler threatens to fire them both if no one steps forward, Campbell tells the truth, resulting in the loss of Strickland's job. In retaliation, Strickland challenges Campbell to a fist fight after school.

Convinced that he does not stand a chance against Strickland, Campbell tries to set matters straight. He bribes Neil into giving a false testimony to Principal Tyler in order to clear Strickland's name. The plan works, and Strickland gets reinstated.

Campbell and Strickland receive an emergency call from school counselor Holly. The two meet up with her in and discover she tricked them into coming there so they could talk through their issues. When Campbell tells Strickland that he was able to get him his job back, Strickland is further enraged. He states that Campbell should have told him about this plan before acting, citing the mishandling of the school system. The fight is still on.

Campbell tries to call 9-1-1 for help, but after learning the reason for his call, the operator laughs and hangs up on him. After seeking the advice of Holly and Coach Crawford, Campbell resolves to have Strickland removed from the campus before the day's end. As a last resort, Campbell threatens Neil into giving him MDMA. Campbell then plants it in Strickland's satchel. He calls the police in the hopes of having Strickland arrested, but the attempt is botched and both teachers are incarcerated.

The two share a cell with other inmates, and Campbell secretly tricks an enormous inmate into giving Strickland a beating, but only when signaled. Campbell then returns to Strickland, who decides to call the fight off after everything that they have been through that day. The inmate nonetheless attacks Strickland, who easily knocks him out. Upon realizing Campbell's actions, Strickland declares the fight back on. The two are then released after the police discover the drug used to frame Strickland was only aspirin.

Campbell heads back to meet up with the school board, Tyler, and Superintendent Johnson, but learns that his colleagues have all been fired. Campbell is one of the few to remain at his position. However, Campbell stands his ground and voices his complaints about the public school system not receiving the support it truly needs. He heads over to Ally's talent show, where her rendition of Big Sean's "I Don't Fuck with You" inspires him to finally stand up to Strickland.

In the school parking lot, Campbell and Strickland engage in a frenzied fight that is dragged throughout the school. During it, Strickland answers Campbell's phone and learns that Maggie is about to give birth. Showing mercy on Campbell, Strickland drives him to the hospital, thus ending the fight on friendly terms.

That summer, Tyler arrives at the Campbell household to tell Campbell that the publicity and public outcry the fight generated has forced the Department of Education to put more effort and money into their schools, and he must rehire Campbell and Strickland. Campbell accepts on the condition that the rest of his colleagues be reinstated as well. As the new school year begins, the faculty return to their respective positions. Campbell and Strickland, now best friends, are ready to enforce learning with Campbell being much more assertive towards the students.

In a post-credits scene, Crawford is seen flirting with the 911 operator in person. After rapping for her, Crawford realizes that he does not know her name.

Cast 
 Ice Cube as Ron Strickland, a tough and hot-headed history teacher and Campbell's colleague.
 Charlie Day as Andrew "Andy"/"Light Roast" Campbell, the main protagonist, a mild-mannered English teacher.
 Tracy Morgan as Coach Crawford, a comical gym teacher.
 Jillian Bell as Miss Holly, a lecherous guidance counselor under the influence of various vices.
 Christina Hendricks as Ms. Monet, an intense drama teacher who wants Strickland to beat Campbell.
 Kumail Nanjiani as Officer Mehar, the school security guard who dislikes profanity.
 Dean Norris as Richard Tyler, the disgruntled and pompous principal of the Roosevelt High School.
 Austin Zajur as Neil, a mischievous student at Roosevelt High School.
 Dennis Haysbert as Superintendent Johnson, the superintendent of the school district that Roosevelt High School is in.
 JoAnna Garcia Swisher as Maggie Campbell, the devoted, loving and pregnant wife of Andy.
 Alexa Nisenson as Ally Campbell, Andy and Maggie's daughter
 Kym Whitley as 911 Operator
 Max Carver as Daniel
 Charlie Carver as Nathaniel
 Stephnie Weir as Suzie

Production 
In December 2013, it was announced that New Line Cinema was developing Fist Fight, a comedy from writers Van Robichaux and Evan Susser. On June 9, 2015, Ice Cube and Charlie Day were cast in the film, which 21 Laps Entertainment produced, along with its Shawn Levy, as well as Billy Rosenberg and Max Greenfield. On July 10, Richie Keen was confirmed to direct the film, while Dan Cohen was set to also produce. On September 15, 2015, Jillian Bell and Dean Norris were also cast in the film, and on September 21, 2015, Tracy Morgan, JoAnna Garcia, and Dennis Haysbert joined the cast. On September 25, 2015, Christina Hendricks was added to the cast, and Kym Whitley was later confirmed to appear.

Principal photography on the film began on September 28, 2015, in Atlanta, Georgia, and ended on November 23, 2015.

Reception

Box office
Fist Fight grossed $32.2 million in the United States and Canada and $8.9 million in other territories, for a worldwide total of $41.1 million.

In North America, the film opened on February 17, 2017, alongside A Cure for Wellness and The Great Wall, and was initially projected to gross $15–20 million from 3,184 theaters in its opening weekend. After grossing $600,000 from Thursday night previews and $3.8 million on its first day, projections were lowered to $10–12 million. The film went on to open to $12.2 million, finishing 5th at the box office.

Critical response
On Rotten Tomatoes, the film has an approval rating of 25% based on 134 reviews and an average rating of 4.10/10. The site's critical consensus reads, "Fist Fight boasts a surplus of comedic muscle but flails lazily, and far too few of its jokes land with enough force to register." On Metacritic, the film has a score of 37 out of 100 based on 28 critics, indicating "generally unfavorable reviews". Audiences polled by CinemaScore gave the film an average grade of "B" on an A+ to F scale.

Writing for RogerEbert.com, Glenn Kenny gave the film of 3 out of 4 stars, saying: "Fist Fight stands up, at least a little bit, for storytelling". In contrast, Richard Roeper gave the film zero out of four stars and wrote that he disliked the film enough to wish for a technical malfunction to disrupt the showing. British film critic Mark Kermode called it "Shoddily written, screechingly performed, crude, crass, endurance-testing... It's utter, utter, utter rubbish."

See also 
 Three O'Clock High

References

External links 
 
 

2017 films
2017 directorial debut films
2017 comedy films
2010s buddy comedy films
2010s pregnancy films
21 Laps Entertainment films
Remakes of American films
American buddy comedy films
American high school films
Dune Entertainment films
American pregnancy films
Films scored by Dominic Lewis
Films about educators
Films set in Georgia (U.S. state)
Films shot in Atlanta
Village Roadshow Pictures films
New Line Cinema films
Warner Bros. films
2010s English-language films
2010s American films